The World Anti-Slavery Convention met for the first time at Exeter Hall in London, on 12–23 June 1840. It was organised by the British and Foreign Anti-Slavery Society, largely on the initiative of the English Quaker Joseph Sturge. The exclusion of women from the convention gave a great impetus to the women's suffrage movement in the United States.

Background 

The Society for the Abolition of the Slave Trade (officially Society for Effecting the Abolition of the Slave Trade) was principally a Quaker society founded in 1787 by 12 men, nine of whom were Quakers and three Anglicans, one of whom was Thomas Clarkson. Due to their efforts, the international slave trade was abolished throughout the British Empire with the passing of the Slave Trade Act 1807. The Society for the Mitigation and Gradual Abolition of Slavery Throughout the British Dominions, in existence from 1823 to 1838, helped to bring about the Slavery Abolition Act 1833, advocated by William Wilberforce, which abolished slavery in the British Empire from August 1834, when some 800,000 people in the British empire became free.

Similarly, in the 1830s many women and men in America acted on their religious convictions and moral outrage to become a part of the abolitionist movement. Many women in particular responded to Wm. Lloyd Garrison's invitation to become involved in the American Anti-Slavery Society. They were heavily involved, attending meetings and writing petitions. Arthur Tappan and other conservative members of the society objected to women engaging in politics publicly.

Given the perceived need for a society to campaign for anti-slavery worldwide, the British and Foreign Anti-Slavery Society (BFASS) was accordingly founded in 1839. One of its first significant deeds was to organise the World Anti-Slavery Convention in 1840: "Our expectations, we confess, were high, and the reality did not disappoint them." The preparations for this event had begun in 1839, when the Society circulated an advertisement inviting delegates to participate in the convention. Over 200 of the official delegates were British. The next largest group was the Americans, with around 50 delegates. Only small numbers of delegates from other nations attended.

Benjamin Robert Haydon painted The Anti-Slavery Society Convention, 1840, a year after the event that today is in the National Portrait Gallery. This very large and detailed work shows Alexander as Treasurer of the new Society. The painting portrays the 1840 meeting and was completed the next year. The new society's mission was "The universal extinction of slavery and the slave trade and the protection of the rights and interests of the enfranchised population in the British possessions and of all persons captured as slaves."

The question of women's participation
The circular message, distributed in 1839, provoked a controversial response from some American opponents of slavery. The Garrisonian faction supported the participation of women in the anti-slavery movement. They were opposed by the supporters of Arthur and Lewis Tappan. When the latter group sent a message to the BFASS opposing the inclusion of women, a second circular was issued in February 1840 which explicitly stated that the meeting was limited to "gentlemen".

Despite the statement that women would not be admitted, many American and British female abolitionists, including Lucretia Mott, Elizabeth Cady Stanton, and Lady Byron, appeared at the World Anti-Slavery Convention in London. The American Anti-Slavery Society, the Garrisonian faction, made a point to include a woman, Lucretia Mott, and an African American, Charles Lenox Remond, in their delegation. Both the Massachusetts and Pennsylvania Anti-Slavery Societies sent women members as their delegates, including Abigail Kimber, Elizabeth Neall, Mary Grew, and Sarah Pugh. Cady Stanton was not herself a delegate; she was in England on her honeymoon, accompanying her husband Henry Brewster Stanton, who was a delegate. (Notably, he was aligned with the American faction that opposed women's equality.) Wendell Phillips proposed that female delegates should be admitted, and much of the first day of the convention was devoted to discussing whether they should be allowed to participate. Published reports from the convention noted "The upper end and one side of the room were appropriated to ladies, of whom a considerable number were present, including several female abolitionists from the United States." The women were allowed to watch and listen from the spectators gallery but could not take part.

In sympathy with the excluded women, the Americans William Garrison, Charles Lenox Remond, Nathaniel P. Rogers, and William Adams refused to take their seat as delegates as well, and joined the women in the spectators' gallery.

Lucretia Mott and Elizabeth Cady Stanton, who eight years later organized the Seneca Falls Convention, met at this convention.

Proceedings (incomplete)
The convention's organising committee had asked the Reverend Benjamin Godwin to prepare a paper on the ethics of slavery. The convention unanimously accepted his paper, which condemned not just slavery but also the world's religious leaders and every community who had failed to condemn the practice. The convention resolved to write to every religious leader to share this view. The convention called on all religious communities to eject any supporters of slavery from their midst.

George William Alexander reported on his visits in 1839, with James Whitehorn, to Sweden and the Netherlands to discuss the conditions of slaves in the Dutch colonies and in Suriname. In Suriname, he reported, there were over 100,000 slaves with an annual attrition rate of twenty per cent. The convention prepared open letters of protest to the respective sovereigns.

Joseph Pease spoke and accused the British government of being complicit in the continuing existence of slavery in India.

Legacy
After leaving the convention on the first day, being denied full access to the proceedings, Lucretia Mott and Elizabeth Cady Stanton "walked home arm in arm, commenting on the incidents of the day, [and] we resolved to hold a convention as soon as we returned home, and form a society to advocate the rights of women." Eight years later they hosted the Seneca Falls Convention in Seneca Falls, New York.

One hundred years later, the Women's Centennial Congress was held in America to celebrate the progress that women had made since they were prevented from speaking at this conference.

Incomplete list of delegates (and women who attended) 
The official list of delegates has 493 names.

References

Sources

Further reading

External links 
 

Women's rights in the United States
1840 in England
1840 conferences
Articles containing image maps
June 1840 events
Abolitionism in the United Kingdom
Abolitionism in the United States
Abolitionist conventions